Approach shot may refer to;

 In racket sports, when a competitor places a shot while moving towards the net in sports such as:
 Pickleball
 Tennis
 Approach shot (golf), a shot intended to land on the green

See also
 Approach (disambiguation)